General Vincent may refer to:

Berkeley Vincent (1871–1963), British Army brigadier general
Charles Humbert Marie Vincent (1753–1831), French general of the Revolution and the Empire
Clinton D. "Casey" Vincent (1914–1955), U.S. Air Force brigadier general
Douglas Vincent (Australian Army officer) (1916–1995), Australian Army major general
Hal W. Vincent (1927–2015), U.S. Marine Corps major general
John Vincent (British Army officer) (1764–1848), British Army major general
Karl von Vincent (1757–1834), Habsburg Austrian Army general in the French Revolutionary Wars
Richard Vincent, Baron Vincent of Coleshill (1931–2018), British Army general
Strong Vincent (1837–1863), Union Army brigadier general